The Chamberlain Bridge, is a historic bridge connecting the towns of Chamberlain and Oacoma across the Missouri River and Lake Francis Case in Brule County, South Dakota. The bridge was originally completed in 1925 and carried U.S. Route 16 (US 16) over the Missouri River.

In 1953, Lake Francis Case was created by the new Fort Randall Dam and the bridge became obsolete. The Wheeler Bridge, also completed in 1925, was floated up the river  and the two bridges were joined to span the new lake. The bridge now carries Interstate 90 Business (I-90 Bus.).

Chamberlain Bridge is designated South Dakota Department of Transportation bridge no. 08-068-084 and was listed on the National Register of Historic Places in 2001.

1925 bridge
In 1923 South Dakota's bridge fund had a balance of $4 and groups from Rosebud, Chamberlain, Pierre,  Forest City and Mobridge asked the state legislature to fund a bridge in their location to cross the Missouri River. State bridge engineer John Edward Kirkham promised that he could build all five bridges for $2 million, even though a single bridge at Bismarck, North Dakota across the Missouri had recently cost $1.3 million.  Kirkham later fulfilled his promise, building all five bridges for a total of $2.1 million. 

The original Chamberlain Bridge was composed of four 336-foot riveted Pennsylvania through truss spans laid end to end. It was built by the Missouri Valley Bridge & Iron Works of Leavenworth, Kansas and completed in September 1925 at an estimated cost of $303,623.

The  Wheeler Bridge, originally known as the Rosebud Bridge, was composed of six 256-foot pin-connected Pennsylvania through truss spans. It was built by the Kansas City Bridge Company with steel provided by the American Bridge Co. and also completed in September 1925. Its estimated cost was $771,080. This bridge with its pin-connections, was designed to be disassembled because Kirkham thought that it might be replaced with a combined railroad-highway bridge.

1953 bridge
As the waters of Lake Francis Case began to rise in 1953, sections of the Wheeler Bridge were floated northward to construct the new Chamberlain Bridge.  The new bridge site was slightly south of the old bridge site and the bridge was in effect widened by using two parallel bridge spans to replace one span on the old bridge. The four spans of the old Chamberlain bridge formed the easternmost two double-spans of the new bridge.  The six smaller spans from the Wheeler Bridge formed the westernmost three double-spans of the new bridge.  The cost of construction was $4.5 million and the new bridge was dedicated on December 7, 1953.

See also
 
 
 
 
 List of crossings of the Missouri River
 List of bridges on the National Register of Historic Places in South Dakota
 National Register of Historic Places listings in Brule County, South Dakota
 National Register of Historic Places listings in Lyman County, South Dakota

References

External links
South Dakota State Historic Preservation Office Flickr photo of the bridge from bank to bank
South Dakota State Historic Preservation Office Flickr photo of the roadway

Road bridges on the National Register of Historic Places in South Dakota
Bridges over the Missouri River
Bridges completed in 1925
National Register of Historic Places in Brule County, South Dakota
U.S. Route 16
Interstate 90
Metal bridges in the United States
Pennsylvania truss bridges in the United States
Chamberlain, South Dakota
1920s establishments in South Dakota
Transportation in Brule County, South Dakota